The Motorola Razr (styled RAZR, pronounced  like "razor"; codenamed Siliqua) is a series of mobile phones by Motorola, part of the 4LTR line. The V3 was the first phone shown in the series and was introduced in December 2003 and released in the market in the third quarter of 2004. The V3 model was followed soon thereafter by the improved V3i, including a collaboration with Apple Inc. for iTunes to be built-in. It was launched in 2006.

Because of its unique appearance and thin profile, it was initially marketed as an exclusive fashion phone. However, within a year, its price was lowered and as a result, it sold over 100 million units by July 2006. Leading up to the release, Motorola's cell phone division sales were stagnant and losing money. The success of the Razr made the division profitable again. Over the Razr's four-year run, the V3 model sold more than 130 million units, becoming the best-selling clamshell phone in the world to date.

The Razr series was marketed until July 2007, when the succeeding Motorola Razr2 series was released. The succeeding models were the V8, the V9, and the V9m. However, Razr2 sales were not as good as the original V3 series, with consumers moving to competing products. Because Motorola relied so long upon the Razr and its derivatives and was slow to develop new products in the growing market for feature-rich touchscreen and 3G phones, the Razr appeal declined, leading Motorola to eventually drop behind Samsung and LG in market share for mobile phones. Motorola's strategy of grabbing market share by selling tens of millions of low-cost Razrs cut into margins and resulted in heavy losses in the cellular division.

In October 2011, Motorola revived the Razr brand for a line of Android smartphones: the Droid Razr for Verizon Wireless (known simply as the "Motorola RAZR" on other networks) and an improved variant, the Droid Razr Maxx. The line shared its trademark thinness and stylized tapered corners with the original. In November 2019, Motorola revived the Razr again as a foldable smartphone, which is styled after the clamshell form factor of the original models.

V3

The V3 was first released in Q3 2004. The team of the V3 put together a number of design choices that set the device apart from the competition. The phone had the thinnest profile at the time on a clamshell set, sported an electroluminescent keypad made out of a single metal wafer and used an industry-standard mini-USB port for data, battery charger and headphones, housed in an aluminum body with an external glass screen. It sold 130 million units during its lifespan, being the best selling clamshell phone to date.

Some owners complained about dust accumulating between the V3's plastic screen and LCD glass, possibly through an external side button. Access to the dust required peeling off the plastic cover, usually followed by a replacement cover.

Matte black version
A black version was produced for distribution in the 77th Academy Awards gift bags, and was released in early May 2005. While distribution was initially limited to specific carriers in North America, the black V3 was widely available elsewhere.

Hot pink versions
The first pink version was released in October 2005, and as of June 2006, was available in the United States from T-Mobile as the Razr V3 Magenta (after T-Mobile and its parent Deutsche Telekom's corporate color). It was called the Razr V3 Pink and available on other carriers, including on T-Mobile networks in other countries in addition to Verizon, Cingular Wireless, Suncom Wireless, and Cellular One (each in a different shade). It was also available in Canada from Bell, Rogers Wireless and Telus, and in the United Kingdom from T-Mobile and Carphone Warehouse. $25 of sales from the Rogers-branded pink V3 went to Rethink Breast Cancer. It was also available in all Movistar-serviced countries and Claro (Telcel).

MS500
Another version of the phone was released in South Korea on June 1, 2005. This version had a similar physical appearance but instead of using the GSM standard, it used CDMA to operate on SK Telecom. It was the first CDMA version of the Razr without expandable memory, Bluetooth, and SIM card, since Motorola Korea's system was able to produce its own model before worldwide GSM format release. It had a 1.3-megapixel camera, video recording, 80 MB of internal memory, and a variety of UI features, such as a mobile blog, Yoga graphic book, diet diary, and lottery number generator for wellness theme. It also came in black, pink, and lime models versions. On February 8, 2006 Motorola Korea released its own slide-phone model for the Razr named Z model name MS600. Unlike most other versions, the MS500 version was packaged with a charging dock and had three metal terminals on the backside immediately under the battery cover.

Also, as the add-on to the MS600, the MS500 Lime Razr was in circulation in South Korea since October 2006 along with the Motorola KRZR Black and Motorola KRZR Fire (Red).

A model that based on MS500 released as V3c in China, but with no relation with V3c that released in North America.

V3re
The Razr V3re (also known as V3_06) was a GSM model updated to support EDGE and CrystalTalk technology. It was nearly identical to the original V3, having no memory card slot and including a VGA 4x zoom camera. It can be identified by a slightly larger notch under the Motorola logo when closed, a black matte Motorola logo in the battery cover instead of the metallic silver logo in the V3 and a software version starting with R3442A. It was available in North America from T-Mobile and AT&T in the US, Rogers/Fido in Canada and Vivo in Brazil (using both 850 MHz and 1800 MHz). It was available in three colors: orchid pink, silver, and stone grey.

V3r/V3t
The V3r and V3t were models sold by T-Mobile, AT&T (formerly Cingular), and Canadian cellular providers such as Rogers. These models were virtually identical to the V3 and V3i, except for featuring Motorola's Digital Audio Player (DAP) instead of iTunes. T-Mobile's V3r offered a voice notes feature which permitted forwarding audio recordings to voicemail as the only storage method.

V3i

The V3i was announced in November 2005 and addressed some of the faults of the original Razr V3, including a better (1.23-megapixel) camera with 8x digital zoom, an improved external and internal display, and support for microSD cards of up to 512 Mb maximum. V3i was functionally very close to the Motorola V635. The V3i came in two versions: one with iTunes and one with Motorola's Digital Audio Player (DAP). The iTunes version of the phone had a 50 or 100 song limit restriction depending on where the phone model was made. The phone's looks were also subtly changed. It was announced on December 8, 2005, that Motorola had teamed up with Dolce & Gabbana (D&G) to produce a Special Edition Gold Razr V3t. Only 1,000 of these were made and sold for a premium price.

On June 1, 2006, Motorola and Dolce & Gabbana released another limited edition gold phone. This model included a D&G cell phone holder, a signature leather pouch, Bluetooth headphones, and FM earphones. It was available from all major Motorola retailers and select D&G boutiques.

The V3i was available in the following colors:
 Silver Quartz (main color)
 Gunmetal Grey
 Gold Plate
 Dark Blue
 Maroon
 Violet
 Orchid
 Black for (PRODUCT)RED (special edition to tie in with the (PRODUCT) RED initiative)
 Platinum
 Red
 Chrome Green
 Chrome Purple
 Celery (also known as Lime Green)
The Motorola Razr V3i was released to most worldwide markets in Q4 of 2005–2006. In the U.S. the phone was released through Cingular Wireless on September 6, 2006, with a new activation price of $299, while T-Mobile released the Dolce & Gabbana V3i exclusively in the United States.

V3im
The V3im was the iTunes version of the Razr V3i available in the UK market with a 100-song cap.

V3c
On November 21, 2005, a CDMA2000 version of the Razr, known as the Razr V3c, became available to Alltel and SaskTel users. Verizon Wireless followed suit on December 7, 2005. Unlike models for Alltel and other carriers, Verizon's V3c features a proprietary user interface and disables, in software, Bluetooth file transfer capabilities (called OBEX).

In January 2006, Canadian Telus, Bell Mobility and Aliant Mobility, Venezuelan carriers Movistar and Movilnet, and Brazilian Vivo began carrying the V3c. In April 2006 Cricket Communications began selling the V3c. The handset was also made available for Metro PCS. The Razr V3c supported CDMA 2000 1xRTT and 1xEV-DO third-generation wireless technologies.

US Cellular and Alaska Communications Systems also carried the V3c. It had approximately 41.2 MB of internal memory, although only about 36 MB was available for use. The V3c did not support expansion with a memory card.

The original version of the V3c was charcoal gray, and a light pink version called Satin Pink (different from the GSM Magenta/Pink and the AT&T Cotton Candy versions) was released by Verizon Wireless in January 2006. Telus Mobility, Bell, Aliant, and Vivo also carried pink versions of the V3c.

V3m
V3m was a CDMA version of the Razr. As an upgrade to the V3c, it featured a microSD card slot for up to 2 GB of memory expansion, a longer-lasting battery, and 40 MB of internal memory. The V3m came in silver, pink, and red although the original release, as well as models that used to be available on the Sprint CDMA network, featured the gunmetal gray color of the V3c. For a limited time Alltel and US Cellular offered a Fire Red color. Partnering with Motorola, US Cellular and Sprint released a special PRODUCT(RED) Razr and Bluetooth H500 headset to help support Global Fund programs which positively impact the lives of women and children affected by HIV/AIDS in Africa.

Verizon Wireless version

Verizon Wireless disabled certain features on the V3m including the ability to transfer data files to and from the phone via Bluetooth (a specific protocol called OBEX). Verizon blocked the transfer of most data over USB, such as ringtones. These phones also ran Binary Runtime Environment for Wireless (BREW), which signs each application to the phones Electronic Serial Number, or ESN, thus preventing the use of free applications (including Back-Up Assistant). Equivalent models offered by competitors (such as the V3t) retained these features.

The V3m on Verizon could play .WMA formatted music files placed in the my_music directory of the removable memory chip, but although the telephone could accept a 2 GB memory chip, only a portion ( ~ 600 Mbytes) can be accessed by the music player. Stereo headphone playback could be achieved with a miniature USB to 3.5 mm phone jack adapter containing the appropriate interface circuitry; adapters designed for hands-free handset operation may not work.

V3x

Announced in March 2005, the V3x was formerly known as the Motorola V1150. Externally, it appeared to be a larger V3, albeit with enhancements such as a 2.0-megapixel camera. Internally, it was quite different, utilizing a different microprocessor, chipset, an Nvidia GoForce 4200 GPU, and radio ICs. As a 3G product, its feature set was closer to that of phones such as the Motorola V980, e.g., two cameras instead of the single camera typical on GSM or CDMA products. It was not as thin as the V3. It won the "Best 3GSM handset" at the 2006 3GSM World Congress.

M702iG
In Japan, a 3G(W-CDMA) NTT DoCoMo version of the V3x was released in late August 2006. This version had IrDA.

V3xx
Announced in July 2006, the V3xx was a 3G category 5/6 (3.6 Mbit/s) HSDPA and EDGE supported handset. It was extremely similar in appearance to the compact V3i design, but incorporated an improved feature set with a 1.3-megapixel camera, 50 MB of internal memory, support for microSD and Bluetooth A2DP. Like the V3x, it was also equipped with a secondary screen and a higher resolution 240x320 pixel (QVGA) main screen. The V3xx was made available for purchase internationally on the 3 network in November 2006 and was available on AT&T (formerly Cingular). The secondary camera was not available in the United States. The built-in GPU, manufactured by Nvidia (model GoForce 4800) was capable of rendering 3D images through OpenGL ES. The phone included a much faster CPU as well, improving the performance of all features, including 3G/data. With the new CPU, the V3xx also included a fast USB V2.0 for rapid ringtone/image/mp3 file downloads. Older V3's were limited to USB V1.1.

Unlike with the V3 and V3i which were both quad-band GSM, and thus worked on any GSM network, the V3xx came in different variants depending on the local frequency bands used for GSM and UMTS/HSDPA. The North American V3xx was tri-band (850/1800/1900 MHz) GSM and dual-band (850/1900 MHz) UMTS/HSDPA, whereas the version sold in Europe and Asia was tri-band (900/1800/1900 MHz) GSM and single-band (2.1 GHz) UMTS/HSDPA. This was likely due to the need to fit the internal components of the V3xx into a small casing; in early 2007 global phones that supported quad-band GSM and tri-band UMTS/HSDPA were considerably bulkier than the V3xx.

The M702iS version was released as the NTT DoCoMo version of the V3xx which did not have GSM and HSDPA but rather IrDA.

maxx

Motorola Razr maxx (or MotoRazr maxx) was released at the end of 2006 in Europe and on April 27, 2007, elsewhere. The maxx was an upgrade to the popular V3x and was Motorola's second HSDPA 3.5G phone after the Razr V3xx. Although almost identical to the V3x in use and features, the maxx supported additional external touch keys for music control and retained the size of the original Razr V3.

maxx V6

Features
 EDGE
 3.5G
 SMS, EMS, MMS
 50 MB of Memory
 Bluetooth 2.0 + EDR, mini USB 2.0
 Expandable memory card slot (microSD, up to 2 GB)
 Video calling at 15 frames per second
 NVIDIA GeForce 4800 GPU Processor
 2.2 inch TFT LCD up to 262,144 colors
 2.0 megapixels camera with LED flash, Maxx Ve version supports Auto-focus

Telstra Australia

This handset was released on Telstra's NextG network under the original name "Motorola Razr maxx V6". It featured compatibility with both the original 2100 MHz band and the NextG band, 850 MHz. The phone was branded with the Telstra logo and on-screen graphics. The phone was released by Telstra for outright purchase in late 2006 at a price of about A$800. The phone was repackaged late in 2007 and sold with a prepaid plan for $250, locked for use only with Telstra SIM cards. Many of the post-paid phones sold by Telstra in 2007 were inadvertently locked.

Hutchison 3
This handset was released on Hutchison's 3 network under the name "Motorola Razr maxx V6". The phone and home screen were branded with the 3 logo. Internal memory was increased to 60 MB.

maxx Ve

Verizon Wireless
The Razr maxx Ve was available exclusively in the United States for Verizon Wireless customers. The maxx Ve featured EV-DO instead of HSDPA and CDMA2000 1x instead of GSM/UMTS.

The Razr maxx was a 3G HSDPA and EDGE handset predated by the Razr V3x. Initially known as the "maxx V6," it was released in Europe by the end of 2006. The original version had a 2.0-megapixel camera with LED flash, a large  screen with 240x320 QVGA display (like the V3xx) and 50 megabytes of internal storage.  While gaining a significantly improved feature set, it maintained the same thin profile of the original Razr V3. Key to its design was a glass fascia with external touch-sensitive controls for MP3s.

The Verizon Wireless version became available on April 24, 2007. It did not feature a second camera on the inside of the phone; instead, there was a shutter button for focusing and picture taking.

MS500W
Like the previous Model MS500, Motorola Korea announced its Korean version of WCDMA Razr HSDPA, known as Razr Luk. The MS500W upgrades its screen to 2.2 inch TFT QVGA, 1.3-megapixel camera with Bluetooth, and microSDHC support. The model features different color pattern compare to previous MS500, and hit the Korean market by late February 2009.

VE20
The Razr VE20 was an updated CDMA model of the original Razr. It was released in the U.S. for Sprint, Alltel, and US Cellular. It incorporated some of the design elements of the Razr² V9m at a reduced price. Its rounded clamshell body was almost as thin as the Razr V3m. It featured a QVGA main display, outer display with virtual touch keys, 2-megapixel camera, stereo Bluetooth, and a microSD memory card slot up to 8 Gb.

Razr2 (V8, V9, V9m, V9x)

The Razr2 was the successor to the Razr series. The Razr2 was 2 mm thinner than its predecessor but slightly wider. Some versions featured Motorola's MotoMagx operational platform, based on the MontaVista Linux OS. The Razr2 was made available on every US carrier, and EVDO, GSM and HSDPA versions of it were released by late 2007. The Razr2 line consisted of 4 models: V8, V9, V9m, and V9x.
The phone improved picture quality, speed, and multimedia capabilities over the original Razr. It also featured an external screen with touch-sensitive buttons which allowed users to use some of the phone features without opening it, and Motorola's CrystalTalk technology to improve call quality and help reduce background noise. Different color variants were released, including a Luxury Edition and a Ferrari Edition.

Droid Razr
The Razr brand returned in 2011 with the introduction of the Motorola Droid Razr smartphone (the "Droid" name only used by Verizon in the USA), featuring a thin body like the original Razr V3. The line included:
Droid Razr, flagship successor of the Droid Bionic
Droid Razr Maxx, variant with larger battery
Motorola Razr V, a cheaper Droid Razr released in Canada
Droid Razr HD, new flagship introduced in 2012
Droid Razr Maxx HD, variant with larger battery
Droid Razr M, same internals as Droid Razr HD but in a smaller body
Motorola RAZR i, variant with an Intel Atom-powered chip and no 4G
Motorola Razr D1 and D3, entry-level products released in Brazil in 2013

The Droid Razr HD and Droid Razr M were succeeded by the Droid MAXX and Droid Mini respectively.

Razr (2020) 

The Razr (2020), also called the Razr 2019, depending on the source, is a foldable smartphone with a design reminiscent of the classic Razr V3. It was designed with nostalgia in mind – its design was supposed to remind people of the early 21st century, a time many look back at with fondness and sentiment. It was supposed to be a capable, modern, Android-running smartphone with a "high-tech" folding display and advanced modern features such as a fingerprint sensor, inside of a body that already felt familiar to many. It features a display that folds vertically, like the familiar V3 and other Razr models from the 2000s.

Motorola presented the phone on November 14, 2019. It was priced at $1,499 and initially only available on Verizon Wireless. The phone was originally expected to launch in January 2020, but was subsequently delayed until February 6, 2020. When it launched, it was received with mixed reviews. Many reviewers felt it was too expensive for its specifications. Its camera, battery life, weak build quality, and price were criticized, while the design and software were praised. PC Magazine summed it up: "Motorola's gorgeous folding Razr doesn't deliver the performance you expect from a $1,500 phone". The Verge wrote harshly: "I wish I could tell you exactly where I think the Motorola Razr went wrong, but there are too many options to choose from".

On September 9, 2020, Motorola announced the second generation of Motorola Razr (2020), called the Razr 5G. The second generation included many improvements over the first generation and was initially priced at $1399.99 in the US. It was, however, also criticized for reasons similar to the first phone. The Verge wrote: "It’s better than the original in every way but still costs too much".

Cultural impact
Being the slimmest phone during its release in 2004, the Razr easily stood out amongst other phone models. It was one of the most popular mobile phones since its first release, having been spotted in the hands of celebrities and business people alike until the advent of smartphones, and it is frequently seen in reruns of movies and TV shows.

It was also a token piece in the popular modernized board game Monopoly Here & Now.

In popular culture
The Razr became identified as a "fashion" product and an iconic cell phone in the mid-2000s. The Razr was used in several television shows and featured in several movies. In the 2006 film A Good Year, Russell Crowe's character Max Skinner used a BlackBerry whilst working as a high-flying London financier, but chose a black Razr to accompany his later laid-back life in rural Provence. Notable TV occasions were the season three finale of the TV series Lost in which Jack Shephard used a Razr (an important plot point which anchors the episode's chronology), the HBO hit sitcom Entourage had characters specifically Ari Gold using it, and the US hit series Burn Notice in which Michael Westen used a Razr until 2009. In Season 5 of 24, President Charles Logan used a Razr as his personal cell phone. Contestants on the NBC adventure reality show "Treasure Hunters" were given Razrs for communication with the host and each other throughout the season. The Product Red edition of the Razr was launched by Oprah Winfrey and Bono for charity. A grey V3 was also used by Jeremy Clarkson on BBC's Top Gear during outtakes when he got a call at the start of the show. Even in 2012, the Razr was used as CIA-special agent Rex Matheson's phone in the 4th season of Torchwood.
It was popularised in South India through the movie Vettaiyaadu Vilaiyaadu, in which Kamal Haasan was seen using the phone. In the computer game Counter-Strike: Source, the character Leet can be seen holding one. In Prison Break Series, Alexander Mahone used the Motorola V3. Also, in the 2006 film  The Devil Wears Prada, characters played by Meryl Streep and Stanley Tucci used Moto Razr phones.

In the 2017 Square Enix game Life Is Strange: Before the Storm, the main character's phone is a Motorola RAZR, decorated with stickers.

See also 

 Motorola Razr2
 Motorola Razr3
 Motorola TXTR
 Star Trek Communicator (1964)
 Grillo telephone (1965)

References

External links

 Motorola Razr V3
 Motorola Razr V3 Blue
 Motorola Razr V3i
 Motorola Razr V3i DG
 Motorola Razr V3im
 Motorola Razr V3m
 Motorola Razr V3c
 Motorola Razr V3x
 Motorola Razr V3xx
 Motorola Razr maxx Ve
 MotoDev Developer information

Reviews
 Motorola Razr Reviews - CNET.com.au

Razr 1
Mobile phones introduced in 2003
Symbian devices
ITunes
Computer-related introductions in 2003
Articles containing video clips